Richard Edward Gant (born March 10, 1944) is an American actor. His credits include the film Rocky V (1990), where he played the Don King-esque George Washington Duke; Hostetler in Deadwood (2004–2006); and Owen in Men of a Certain Age (2009–2012).

He has also appeared in a 1989 episode of Miami Vice, as Battlin’ Barry Gay; as a possessed coroner in Jason Goes to Hell: The Final Friday (1993); and in the films and TV shows Deadwood, The Big Lebowski, Babylon 5, Special Unit 2, L.A. Law, NYPD Blue, Living Single, Posse, Seinfeld, Friends, How I Met Your Mother, Men Don't Tell, and Charmed. He appeared in one episode each of Lois and Clark: The New Adventures of Superman and Smallville.

He has also appeared in Nutty Professor II: The Klumps and Bean: The Ultimate Disaster Movie, as well as reporter Charles Parker in the cult classic adaptation of Colin Bateman’s Divorcing Jack.

He had a minor role as a senior naval officer in Roland Emmerich's Godzilla. Gant was also in Daddy Day Camp as Col. Buck Hinton. Gant joined General Hospital on February 6, 2007 in the role of Dr. Russell Ford. He starred in Men of a Certain Age for its entire two-season run on TNT from 2009 to 2011.

Other achievements
Gant was the campaign manager for federal elections in the country of Nigeria. He was presented with the Key to the City of Oakland, California by the Mayor Jerry Brown. He is a member of the Phi Beta Sigma fraternity.

Filmography

References

External links

1944 births
American male film actors
American male television actors
Berkeley High School (Berkeley, California) alumni
Living people
Male actors from San Francisco
African-American male actors
20th-century American male actors
21st-century American male actors
20th-century African-American people
21st-century African-American people